Patricia Coleman (born 13 May 1953) is an Australian former tennis player. She played in the Australian Open singles from 1971 to 1974. In 1972 she reached the final of the doubles event at the Australian Open with Karen Krantzcke.

Grand Slam finals

Doubles (1 runner-up)

References

External links
 
 
 

Australian female tennis players
Living people
1953 births
Tennis people from New South Wales
Australian Open (tennis) junior champions
Grand Slam (tennis) champions in girls' singles